is a former Japanese football player and manager. He was most recently the manager of Mito HollyHock until 2022. His cousin Nobuhide Akiba is also footballer.

Club career
Akiba was born in Chiba on October 13, 1975. After graduating from high school, he joined his local club JEF United Ichihara in 1994. He played many matches as defensive midfielder in 1995. However his opportunity to play decreased for injury in 1996. Although he moved to Avispa Fukuoka (1997) and Cerezo Osaka (1998), he could hardly play in the match. He moved to J2 League club Albirex Niigata in 1999. He played as regular player and the club was promoted to J1 League end of 2003 season. However his opportunity to play decreased in 2004 season and he moved to Tokushima Vortis in 2005. He played many matches and he moved to Thespa Kusatsu in September 2006. He played until 2008. He moved to SC Sagamihara in 2009 and played as playing manager until 2010. He retired end of 2010 season.

National team career
In April 1995, Akiba was selected Japan U-20 national team for 1995 World Youth Championship. He played full time in all 4 matches as central defender of three backs defense. In July 1996, he was selected Japan U-23 national team for 1996 Summer Olympics. He played 1 match as substitute as defensive midfielder. Although Japan won 2 matches, Japan lost at First round. At this time, Japan won Brazil in first game. It was known as "Miracle of Miami" (マイアミの奇跡) in Japan.

Coaching career
In 2009, when Akiba was player, he became a playing manager for SC Sagamihara. In 2010, he retired playing career and resigned as manager. In 2011, he signed with Mito HollyHock and became an assistant coach. In 2013, he moved to Thespakusatsu Gunma and became a manager. He resigned end of 2014 season.

On 2 December 2019, Akiba signed return with Mito HollyHock and became a manager, he was previously an assistant coach in 2011. He leave from the club in 2022 after two years as manager at Mito.

Club statistics

Managerial statistics
.

References

External links
 
 
 

1975 births
Living people
Association football people from Chiba Prefecture
Japanese footballers
Japan youth international footballers
J1 League players
J2 League players
JEF United Chiba players
Avispa Fukuoka players
Cerezo Osaka players
Albirex Niigata players
Tokushima Vortis players
Thespakusatsu Gunma players
SC Sagamihara players
Footballers at the 1996 Summer Olympics
Olympic footballers of Japan
Japanese football managers
J2 League managers
SC Sagamihara managers
Thespakusatsu Gunma managers
Mito HollyHock managers
Association football midfielders